The AL class are a class of diesel locomotives built by Clyde Engineering, Rosewater for Australian National in 1976-1977.
They were mechanically similar to the CL class but instead of a bulldog nose had two flat ended cabs, similar to the 422 class built for the New South Wales Government Railways in 1969.

History
The AL class initially operated services on the Trans-Australian Railway from Broken Hill to Kalgoorlie, their sphere of operation being extended to Alice Springs and Adelaide when these lines were converted to standard gauge in 1980 and 1983. Although capable of hauling passenger services, they tended to be restricted to slower freight trains to minimise track pounding due to their weight.

Three were loaned to the NSW Public Transport Commission in 1979 resulting in 80 mechanically similar class 81s being ordered in 1980. From July 1990, through working into New South Wales was introduced resulting in ALs operating services beyond Broken Hill to Lithgow.

In 2004, they began to operate to Darwin following this line opening.

Remanufacturing
In August 1992, Australian National awarded Morrison Knudsen Australia a contract to remanufacture the ALs at its Whyalla factory. As part of the deal Morrison Knudsen purchased the locomotives and leased them back to Australian National for 12 years.

The rebuilding in the first half of 1994 involved stripping back to the frame. Changes included the EMD 645E3 engines being replaced with overhauled EMD 645E3C engines imported from Morrison Knudsen in the USA, removing the No 2 end cab and being reclassified as the ALF class. After rebuilding the locomotives did not retain their numbers, for example the first locomotive converted was AL21 which emerged as ALF18.

In 1994, Australian National's interstate services were transferred to National Rail. The lease with Morrison Knudsen meant the locomotives could only be used on Australian National trains, or a higher lease fee would apply. As a result, the class were not seen on National Rail operated trains, and did not venture onto the wider national standard gauge network until Australian National won hook and pull contracts for private operator SCT Logistics in July 1995.

Private ownership
In November 1997, the AL class were sold to Australian Southern Railroad with Australian National's remaining freight operations. With the splitting up of the Australian Railroad Group in June 2006, one went to QR National and seven Sold to Aurizon.

Current Operations 
Genesee & Wyoming Australia operate their ALF Class locomotives on multiple different trains based out of Adelaide (Motive Power Centre) and Darwin. Such services include Intermodal, (on the Adelaide to Darwin Railway), Grain (from multiple locations throughout South Australia) and Ore (on the 1911S/9112S Wirrida Ore train). Some have seen a livery upgrade include yellow pilots for better visibility.

Fleet list

References

Clyde Engineering locomotives
Co-Co locomotives
ALZ class
Aurizon diesel locomotives
Railway locomotives introduced in 1976
Standard gauge locomotives of Australia
Diesel-electric locomotives of Australia